Magydaris is a genus of perennial herbs in the family Apiaceae, native to the western and central Mediterranean.

Species
, Plants of the World Online accepted two species:
Magydaris panacifolia (Vahl) Lange – Iberian Peninsula and northwestern Africa
Magydaris pastinacea (Lam.) Paol. – southern Italy and Sardinia to northwestern Africa

References

External links 

 Magydaris pastinacea - Zipcodezoo
 Magydaris pastinacea

Apioideae
Taxa named by Constantine Samuel Rafinesque